The women's singles of the 2019 Advantage Cars Prague Open tournament was played on clay in Prague, Czech Republic.

Richèl Hogenkamp was the defending champion, but retired in the semifinals against Tamara Korpatsch.

Korpatsch won the title, defeating Denisa Allertová in the final, 7–5, 6–3.

Seeds

Draw

Finals

Top half

Bottom half

References

External Links
Main Draw

Advantage Cars Prague Open - Singles
Advantage Cars Prague Open